CL-52 or variation, may refer to:

 Canadair CL-52 Stratojet, RCAF jet bomber from the 1950s
 Chlorine 52 (Cl-52; 52Cl), an isotope of chlorine
 CL52, a type of vacuum tube; see List of vacuum tubes
 , WWII USN Atlanta-class light cruiser, whose sinking killed the five Sullivan brothers

See also

 
 CL (disambiguation)